Alwal is a major locality in Secunderabad city, and a suburb of Hyderabad. Earlier, Alwal was a part of Malkajgiri Mandal but in 2006, Alwal Municipality was merged into Greater Hyderabad Municipal Corporation. After the district bifurcation Alwal Municipality became a new Mandal  "Alwal Mandal", in Malkajgiri revenue division, with Alwal as the Mandal Headquarters. It was a part of Ranga Reddy district before the re-organisation of districts in the state. It was a municipality prior to its merger into the Greater Hyderabad Municipal Corporation.

This area is booming as residents of central Hyderabad are moving to Alwal to escape traffic congestion and pollution. However, Alwal too has fallen prey to increasing commercialization and rampant construction activity contributing to pollution and other ills. No proper town planning of once-spacious suburb of Alwal is leaving its "lung spaces", so to speak, thoroughly constricted. The nearby cantonment (military) area offers good lung space for morning walkers/joggers, but this too had been debarred by the Army officials.

History 

Alwal (Circle No.:27, Zone: Kukatpally) is under Hyderabad Municipal Corporation. Alwal is considered one of the safest places in Secunderabad area because it is surrounded with Indian Army Corps of EME, Army Quarters and Rashtrapati Nilayam. Alwal was a prime area under the British Cantonment. It derived its name after ‘Alvars’ who were Tamil poets, the proponents of Bhakti Movement and devotees of Lord Venkateshwara. It is home to a historic Venkateswara temple, which is located near Alwal municipal office and is more than 400 years old. Gundam Balaji Temple is also located in this temple premises, which is stated to be 850 years old. There is a temple in the style of the Lotus Temple, Delhi. This  'Guruvayurappan Temple' is maintained by army and is located near Lal Bazar Ambedkar Statue circle. There is a famous person called Shiva Reddy, we dont know he exists and he is prominently known as the Bondam OF JEE .Thota Muthyalamma Temple is very famous which is 200 meters after crossing Alwal Rythu Bazaar bridge. We see many in many Shiva temples in 'Linga' form. But in this temple, Shiva Parvathi sub temple, Shiva and Parvati are in 'Vigraha' form. Majority of Alwal area belongs to Reddy families, who are relatives and also landlords of residential properties, commercial properties and agricultural properties.

Alwal was a part of Jagir of Sir Kishen Pershad, Prime Minister of Nizam, during the 1920s. Sir Kishen Pershad used to have his ‘Devdi’ (palace) at Alwal and used to spend time here during summer.

Transport 
Public transport include, city buses operated by TSRTC and MMTS rail services from the Alwal railway station called as Alwal Railway Station.

Notable people in Alwal 
 Chintala Venkat Reddy is an organic farmer and Padma Shri 2020 Award Winner
Shyam Benegal, director and screenwriter
B. Narsing Rao, Acclaimed Film Director
 Gaddar, Telugu balladeer and Nandi Award for Best Male Playback Singer 2011
 Banda Karthika Reddy, Ex-Mayor
 Rohith Vakrala, Socio-Political Activist, Analyst, Policy Enthusiast 
 Vijaya Shanthi Reddy Chintala, Corporator from 134 Alwal Division of GHMC.
 Chennamaneni Vasudev Rao, Actor in Indian TV Serials
 Reddy Ravikanth Chintala, Financial Planner
 Rathna Shekar Reddy, Actor in Indian Films and Founder of Samahaara Acting Theater
 Sampath Raj, Actor in Indian Films

Assembly Constituency 

Alwal falls under Malkajgiri Assembly constituency. Alwal circle consists of three divisions: Alwal, Macha Bollaram and Venkatapuram. Alwal is a small place in India and can be easily explored within a day. The place is famous for Lord Shiva and Lord Venkateshwara temples. The famous alwal 'Jatara' happens during the month of December giving a visual and gastronomic treat to its residents.

References 

Neighbourhoods in Hyderabad, India